Justice at Large is an Irish television sitcom that aired on RTÉ for one series in 1969. Starring Paul Farrell, it was written by barrister and actor Rex Mackey.

Plot
Justice at Large was set around the District Court of the fictional Ballyslattery. Much of the action also took place in Ballyslattery's local pub-cum-shop.

Cast
 Paul Farrell as District Justice Byrne
 Martin Dempsey as Sargeant Molloy
 John Molloy as Mullarkey
 Declan Mulholland as Joe Cotter

Production

Recording
The interior scenes for both series were shot in Studio 1 at the RTÉ Television Centre in April and May 1969. The series was not filmed in front of a live studio audience and no laughter track was used.

References

1969 Irish television series debuts
1969 Irish television series endings
1960s Irish television series
Irish television sitcoms
RTÉ original programming